A Main Support Battalion (MSB) was a US Army logistics formation in the "Army of Excellence" period. The role of the MSB was to support soldiers in the division rear and provide designated reinforcing support to the forward support battalions.   The MSBs were converted to serve as the Brigade Support Battalion for the 4th Brigade Combat teams activated as part of the Modularity transformation after 2004.

Organization
One MSB was organic to each Division Support Command. The MSB comprised:
 Headquarters and Headquarters Detachment
 Supply and Service Company
 Transportation Motor Transport Company
 Heavy Maintenance Company
 Electronic Maintenance Company
 Medical Company

See also
 Divisional Support Command

Footnotes

Support battalions of the United States Army